Niludipine is a calcium channel blocker of the dihydropyridine class.  It is a vasodilator that acts upon the coronary arteries of the heart-lung. It was found to produce a calcium antagonistic effect on the smooth muscle of hearts of canines and guinea pigs inhibiting myocardial oxidative metabolism.

References

Calcium channel blockers
Pyridines
Carboxylate esters
Ethers
Nitrobenzenes